2 Low Life Muthas is the debut album released by rap group, Poison Clan. It was released on August 20, 1990, for Luke Records and was produced by 2 Live Crew member, Mr. Mixx. The album sold well in the South, but only managed to make it to #42 on the Top R&B/Hip-Hop Albums. Two singles did pretty well on the charts, "The Bitch That I Hate", peaked at #18 on the Hot Rap Singles and "Dance All Night" peaked at #14 on the Hot Rap Singles.

Track listing
 All songs written by P. Walter, J. Thompkins and D. Hobbs

Personnel
 Mr. Mixx - producer, mixing
 Sheena Moore - additional vocals
 Melissa Cooper - additional vocals
 Michael Sterling - recording engineer, mixing
 Ron Taylor - recording engineer, mixing
 Luther Campbell - executive producer
 Milton Mizell - cover design

Trivia
The vinyl version of the album can briefly be seen in the 1992 film Juice in the scene in which its four main characters steal records from a record store.

References

1990 debut albums
Poison Clan albums
Luke Records albums
Albums produced by Mr. Mixx
Albums produced by Luther Campbell